Lists of fossiliferous stratigraphic units in Canada
 List of fossiliferous stratigraphic units in the Caribbean
 List of fossiliferous stratigraphic units in Central America
 List of fossiliferous stratigraphic units in Greenland
 List of fossiliferous stratigraphic units in Mexico
 Lists of fossiliferous stratigraphic units in the United States

See also
 Lists of fossiliferous stratigraphic units

North America geology-related lists
Geologic formations of North America